Cahama is a town, with a population of 12,767 (2014 census), and a municipality of Cunene Province, Angola. The population of the municipality was 70,061 according to the 2014 census in an area of 9,700 km. The municipality consists of the communes Cahama and Otchinjau.
There is an airport (FN17) to the north of the town.

References

Populated places in Cunene Province
Municipalities of Angola